Heni Ozi Cukier, also known as Professor HOC (born 29 January 1977 in São Paulo) is a political scientist, professor, writer and public speaker. In 2018 Heni was elected state legislator to serve a 4-year term at the State Legislative Assembly of São Paulo. He's a faculty member for the International Relations Program at the ESPM college in São Paulo and also teaches geopolitics on his YouTube channel entitled Professor HOC. From 2017 to 2018 he was Deputy Secretary of Urban Security of the city of São Paulo. Heni is also founder of the international political risk analysis consultancy Insight Geopolítico.

Biography 
He received his BA in philosophy and his BS in political science from Barry University, and his master's degree in International Peace and Conflict Resolution from The American University. Cukier spent 7 years living in the U.S. and has worked for the United Nations at the Security Council in New York, The Organization of American States, Woodrow Wilson International Center for Scholars and the Peacebuilding & Development Institute.

In 2008 Cukier returned to Brazil and founded the Insight Geopolítico, a consultancy firm in international political risk. He is a frequent public speaker and commentator for most media outlets, including O Globo, CNN Brazil, The New York Times, among others. His areas of expertise include international politics, international conflict, political risk, defense politcy, military strategy, political and military intelligence, international and domestic security, international organizations, organized crime and terrorism. 

In 2016 he was the chief campaign strategist for the New Party in the municipal elections of São Paulo. In 2017 he became the Deputy Secretary for Urban Security at the City of São Paulo and led the City Cameras (CCTVs) public surveillance program, as well as efforts to tackle the world's largest open drugs scene of crack-cocaine, Crackland. 

In 2018 Heni was elected state legislator to serve for a 4-year term at the State Legislative Assembly of São Paulo. In his first year he wrote the state’s pension reform report and lead the approval of the reform as well as the floor leader. In 2019 Heni approved the law that establishes the State Drug Policy. In 2021 he approved two other laws related to the COVID-19 pandemic, the "vaccine queue-jumping" and penalties for those who committed crimes of corruption during the pandemic. In July 2021, Heni announced he would run for the Senate in the 2022 elections.

Bibliography

References

Members of the Legislative Assembly of São Paulo
1977 births
Living people
American University alumni
Barry University alumni
New Party (Brazil) politicians
Brazilian Jews
People from São Paulo